Sharon is an unincorporated community in Carroll County, Indiana, in the United States.

History
Sharon was founded in 1868.

References

Unincorporated communities in Carroll County, Indiana
Unincorporated communities in Indiana